Your Worst Nightmare is an American documentary television series on Investigation Discovery that debuted on October 22, 2014. The show is a 60-minute narrated true crime show blending reenactments of key events with commentary from law enforcement, criminal justice professionals, friends and family of the victims, and occasionally, the victims themselves.

Episodes

Season 1 (2014)

Season 2 (2015-2016)

Season 3 (2016-2017)

Season 4 (2017-2018)

Season 5 (2019)

Season 6 (2020)

References

External links

2010s American documentary television series
2014 American television series debuts
Investigation Discovery original programming